The 2018–19 FAW Women's Cup is the 27th edition of the FAW Women's Cup, the premier knock-out cup competition for women's association football teams in Wales.

Most teams entered the competition at the first round stage, however there were also three qualifying round matches and Swansea City were given a bye to the second round as reigning champions, having beaten Cardiff City in the previous season's final.

Format
The tournament is a single-elimination knock-out tournament, with six teams entering in the qualifying round, 27 receiving a bye to the first round proper, and the reigning champions entering at the second round stage.

Calendar

Qualifying round
The draw for the qualifying round took place at the FAW's headquarters in Cardiff. All three matches took place on Sunday 16 September 2018.

First round

Second round

Quarter-finals

Semi-finals

Final

References

External links
FAW Cups on the Football Association of Wales website.
Full video of the final on the Sgorio YouTube channel.

2018–19 in Welsh women's football
FAW Women's Cup
Women